Dolichlasium is a genus of flowering plants in the family Asteraceae.

There is only one known species, Dolichlasium lagascae, endemic to Argentina.

References

Nassauvieae
Endemic flora of Argentina
Monotypic Asteraceae genera
Taxa named by Mariano Lagasca